"I'll Follow You (Up to Our Cloud)" is a song by George Jones. It was written by David Turner.

History
This was Jones' thirty-second and final single release on Musicor before joining his wife Tammy Wynette at Epic Records.

Lyrics 
The song is sung from the perspective of an elderly man who cannot bear the thought of leaving his wife alone after he dies and promises to hold on until it's her time; only then will he "let go" and follow her "up to our cloud."

Reception 

The song failed to make the Top 10, peaking at #13.

Pappy Daily 
The single marked the end of Jones' relationship with producer and manager Pappy Daily, who had guided his career from the beginning. The parting was acrimonious; in Bob Allen's 1983 book George Jones: The Life and Times of a Honky Tonk Legend, the author quotes Jones in interviews complaining about the uneven quality of his recordings and raising questions about the royalty rights that he alleged he had hastily relinquished in the document signing that had accompanied each of his record-label changes. In 1994, record producer Huey Meaux, who had known Jones from the 1940s, defended Daily, insisting to Nick Tosches in the Texas Monthly, "He was George’s career. He was George’s daddy. He was George’s everything. And George gave him a lot of goddam hell, man. Getting drunk, getting in trouble, getting in fights. Pappy was the only one that could sit down and talk to George. Pappy got George back together so many times it’s unreal."

Discography

References

Sources 
 

1971 songs
Song recordings produced by Pappy Daily
Musicor Records singles
George Jones songs